Boddin is a coastal village in Angus, Scotland, two miles south of Montrose.

There are lime kilns at Boddin Point.

References

Villages in Angus, Scotland
Lime kilns in Scotland